Shash Darak is a neighborhood located in District 2 of Kabul, Afghanistan, and includes some of the more important buildings in Kabul, including the palace, the headquarters of NATO-led forces in Afghanistan, the Afghan Defence Ministry and the CIA's Afghan station.

See also 
 Neighborhoods of Kabul

References

Neighborhoods of Kabul